Wolfgang Zimmerer (born 15 November 1940) is a retired West-German bobsledder who mostly competed as a driver together with his brakeman Peter Utzschneider. Zimmerer took part in the 1968, 1972 and 1976 Winter Olympics and won four medals, with one gold (two-man in 1972), one silver (two-man in 1976), and two bronzes (four-man in 1972 and 1976).

Zimmerer and Utzschneider won nine medals at the FIBT World Championships with four golds (two-man: 1973, 1974; four-man: 1969, 1973), three silvers (two-man: 1970, four-man: 1970, 1975), and two bronzes (four-man: 1971, 1973). They also collected 10 medals at the European championships, including five golds: in two-man in 1968, 1972, and 1973, and in the four-man in 1970 and 1973.

Zimmerer's nieces Maria Höfl-Riesch and Susanne Riesch are Olympic alpine skiers.

References

External links

 Bobsleigh two-man Olympic medalists 1932–56 and since 1964
 Bobsleigh four-man Olympic medalists for 1924, 1932–56, and since 1964
 Bobsleigh two-man world championship medalists since 1931
 Bobsleigh four-man world championship medalists since 1930
 
 
 

1940 births
Living people
People from Garmisch-Partenkirchen (district)
Sportspeople from Upper Bavaria
German male bobsledders
Bobsledders at the 1968 Winter Olympics
Bobsledders at the 1972 Winter Olympics
Bobsledders at the 1976 Winter Olympics
Olympic bobsledders of West Germany
Olympic gold medalists for West Germany
Olympic silver medalists for West Germany
Olympic bronze medalists for West Germany
Olympic medalists in bobsleigh
Medalists at the 1976 Winter Olympics
Medalists at the 1972 Winter Olympics